Barry Harris is a Canadian record producer, DJ, remixer, singer and songwriter. He created the synthpop act Kon Kan in early 1988 which had worldwide success with "I Beg Your Pardon". The song, initially issued on the now defunct Toronto-based indie label Revolving Records, was quickly discovered and signed by Atlantic Records' A&R rep, Marc Nathan.

Biography
Between 1997 and 2003, his production team Thunderpuss, co-created with Chris Cox produced worldwide hit remixes for Madonna, Britney Spears, Christina Aguilera, Whitney Houston, Enrique Iglesias, Jennifer Lopez, Mary J. Blige, Céline Dion, Cher, Janet Jackson, Spice Girls, LeAnn Rimes, among others. The duo topped the Billboard Hot Dance/Club Play chart more than 20 times.

Throughout his career, Harris has been involved in numerous projects and enjoyed chart success, most notably as one half of the duos Kon Kan and Thunderpuss. Other involvements include work with Terry Kelly in the house project Top Kat, and with Rachid Wehbi and vocalist Kimberley Wetmore in the house/Eurodance project Outta Control which later became known as Killer Bunnies, with Simone Denny on vocals. Harris has also released several solo singles.

After a four-year break from the music industry from 2005–2009, Harris returned to the dance music scene in the fall of 2009 producing, songwriting and remixing, being the first producer/remixer in 2010 to obtain a Top 5 Billboard chart hit in each of the four decades - 1980s, 1990s, 2000s and 2010s.

Harris also worked alongside Grammy Award-winning producers Rick Nowells, Dennis Matkosky, Giorgio Moroder (also Academy Award-winning), and with Grammy Award nominee Ron Fair.

Harris' discography includes additional co-written hits such as "Dive in the Pool" from Queer as Folk with the catchy line "Let's get soaking wet", the song "Head" which appeared in NBC's Will & Grace, and "I Got My Pride" which appeared in HBO's Sex and the City.

He has produced for artists such as Jennifer Holliday, Taylor Dayne, Paul Robb (Information Society), Engelbert Humperdinck, Donna Summer, Simone Denny, Amber & Micah Barnes.

He has songwritten with David Zippell (Academy Award nominee, Tony Award-winning), Bob Mitchell, Carl Dixon, Jon Lind, Enrique Iglesias and Dennis Matkosky.

Returning to his teen roots, he experimented with the rock genre and co-founded the alt rock band Sick Seconds along with drummer Anton Cook (2011-2013). They recorded one self-titled LP, Sick Seconds.

From 2014–present, Harris returned to DJing, producing dance remixes of tracks by P!nk, Ariana Grande, Justin Bieber, Chainsmokers, Beyoncé, Taylor Swift, Adele, Calvin Harris, Rihanna, Justin Timberlake, Ellie Goulding, Meghan Trainor and Sia, among others.

Awards
1989: Canadian Juno award for "I Beg Your Pardon"
2000: ASCAP Rhythm & Soul Award (writer & publisher SOCAN) for "Dive in the Pool"
2000: WMC - International Music Award - Best Underground 12" Dance Record
2000: WMC Best Remixer - Thunderpuss

References

External links
 
 

Year of birth missing (living people)
Living people
Canadian record producers
Canadian songwriters
Canadian DJs
Canadian house musicians
Club DJs
Remixers
Musicians from Toronto
Synth-pop musicians
Canadian gay musicians
Electronic dance music DJs
21st-century Canadian LGBT people